The following is an incomplete list of paintings by Bartholomeus van der Helst that are generally accepted as autograph by Judith van Gent and other sources. The list is in order of creation, starting from his first dated work in 1637 for the regents of the Walloon Orphanage in Amsterdam. Most of his works are portraits, but he also made some allegories.

Sources
 Bartolomeus van der Helst, proefschrift Leiden University 1921, by J.J. de Gelder, 1921
 Bartholomeus van der Helst (ca. 1613–1670). Een studie naar zijn leven en werk, by Judith van Gent, Waanders, Zwolle, 2011
 Bartolomeus van der Helst in the RKD

Helst
Paintings by Bartholomeus van der Helst